Tuni is a city in Kakinada district of the Indian state of Andhra Pradesh. It is a second biggest city in Kakinada district. It is a major commercial marketing center for more than 100 surrounding villages in the district. Tuni is a border point for the district of Kakinada. It is known for mango production, with nearly 250 varieties being exported from the area. Tuni is also famous for the production of betel leaves and jute bags. A variety of cashew nuts are also produced in Tuni.

History
Tuni as a historical site may date back to the 1st century CE in connection with Buddhism, which flourished in the nearby hillocks and villages such as Gopalapatnam, Satyavaram and Kummarilova, near the city of Tuni on the banks of the Thandava River. The Buddhist monks would have resided in Kummarilova village (Kummararam) from the 2nd century CE to 6th century CE and propagated Buddhism. The Buddhist 'aramas' and 'stupas' found in the village are testimony for their presence, they said. This village is  called 'Panchasheela Buddhist Centre' as five Buddhist 'stupas' have been found here. Archaeology authorities found a Buddhist site at Kummarilova during a general survey carried out recently in the area.

Under the Kshatriyas of Vatsavai Dynasty, it was a Pargana (a sub-division in 15th century) in Keemarseema. After the division it became the capital of Kottam Estate. Tuni has been a famous marketplace since the 19th century CE.

The Tuni Railway station had an important prominence on the Howrah-Madras railway line during the time of British India and after Independence.

Raja Kalasala is one of the oldest schools in Tuni, with a history of more than 100 years. A prominent guerrilla war fighter during the Indian independence movement, Alluri Sitarama Raju, studied here. A statue of him was built at a junction.

Demographics

As per the 2019 census, Tuni Municipality had population of 234,900, of which 123,246 were males while 111,574 were females. The literacy rate within Tuni city is 77.40%, higher than the state average of 67.02%.  The male literacy rate of 82.79%, while the female literacy rate is 72.38%.

Geography
Tuni is at 17.35°N 82.55°E. It has an average elevation of 16 metres (46 ft)

Climate

Economy
A famous, and one of the oldest, sugar factories of Andhra Pradesh "Tandava Sugars" is here. A large number of handloom industries, about 20 cashew nut industries, hetero industries, and 10 other chemical industries are in and around Tuni.

Assembly constituency

Tuni is an assembly constituency (consisting of mandals: Kotananduru, Tuni and Thondangi) in Andhra Pradesh. There were  registered voters in Tuni constituency in the 1999 elections.

Transport 

National Highway 16, a part of Golden Quadrilateral highway network, bypasses the town. The Andhra Pradesh State Road Transport Corporation operates bus services from Tuni bus station. Tuni is located on Howrah-Chennai main line. Visakhapatnam Airport is situated approximately the same distance northeast of Tuni.

Education
Primary and secondary school education is imparted by government, aided and private schools, under the School Education Department of the state. Instruction is available in both English and Telugu.

Notable people 

 Alluri Sita Rama Raju, a freedom fighter
 Avasarala Ramakrishna Rao, a Telugu short story writer
 Vempati Sadasiva Brahmam, a Telugu writer of film stories, dialogues and lyrics, in the early period of Telugu cinema.
 Chandra Sekhar Yeleti, Telugu film director

References

Cities and towns in Kakinada district